The Oslo Astrological Clock is located at Karl Johans gate 3 in Oslo, the capital city of Norway. The astrological clock  was donated by Christian Ringnes and features artwork designed by artists Elena Engelsen and Per Ung. Ringnes explained during his unveiling speech, "we aim to actively contribute in making Oslo a beautiful and pleasant city."

Clock Structure
Astrological signs are cast in bronze and are painted. The rings are made of copper and are also painted. The tiles in the dial are coated with 22-carat gold leaf and the total weight of the clock is approx. .

Artwork
It was designed by artists Elena Engelsen and Per Ung, who spent over a year collaborating on the project. Engelsen created the exotic animal characters star, while Ung designed the human characters in the zodiac. This was the couple’s second joint artwork venture.

Unveiling

The unveiling of the clock took place on October 20, 2010 at a ceremony hosted by Mayor Fabian Stang at Karl Johansgate 3 in central Oslo. He has been quoted as saying, “We are incredibly proud that Oslo now has an astrological clock, especially as it was designed by Elena Engelsen and Per Ung, two of Norway’s most renowned artists. The clock is clearly visible and will set a solid mark on the cityscape."
As a representation of the 12 Zodiac signs, 12 of the foremost astrologers in Norway were among the invited guests at the ceremony.

See also
Prague Astronomical Clock
Chiron astrology

References 

2010 works
Individual clocks
Time in Norway
Astrology